The abstract machine TDF (originally the Ten15 Distribution Format, but more recently redefined as the TenDRA Distribution Format) evolved at the Royal Signals and Radar Establishment in the UK as a successor to Ten15. Its design allowed support for the C programming language.  TDF is the basis for the Architecture Neutral Distribution Format.

External links
 A Guide to the TDF Specification, Issue 4.0 (retrieved on 24 October 2007)

Executable file formats
History of computing in the United Kingdom
Malvern, Worcestershire
Science and technology in Worcestershire